Le Mas Agenais XIII are a French Rugby league club based in Le Mas-d'Agenais, Lot-et-Garonne in the Aquitaine region. The club plays in the Midi-Pyrenees regional League in the French National Division 2. Home matches are played at the Stade Municipal Norbert Tessier.

History 

Le Mas Agenais XIII have always played in the lower reaches of the French Rugby League system. In season 74/75 they won the Federal Division now called the National Division 2 but didn't go up. Since then they have finished runner-up twice, firstly in 96/97 when they lost out to Castelnau XIII 26-38 and then in season 2002/03 when they were beaten by Salses Opoul XIII 22-36. More recently they finished runner-up in the Midi-Pyrenees regional league in 2016.

Club honours 

 National Division 2 (Fédéral Division) (1): 1974-75

Club Details 

President: Franck Labeyrie
Club Address: Le Mas Agenais XIII, 21 rue chopin  47400 Tonneins
Tel: 06 30 20 81 46
Email: f.labeyrie@areas-agence.fr
http://rugbymas13.typepad.com/.a/6a0134873e6f88970c0134873ed7cd970c-150wi

See also 

National Division 2

External links 

 Official Website

French rugby league teams